The Saint Petersburg State University of Engineering and Economics was a public university in Russia , which was known as ENGECON (Russian: ИНЖЭКОН). It is now a part of Saint Petersburg State University of Economics, which was created via its merging with Saint Petersburg State University of Economics and Finance and Saint Petersburg State University of Service and Economics. It was specialized in the fields of economics, management, statistics, logistics and finance.

At the postgraduate level, it is a business school. At the undergraduate level, it also teaches economics.

The Saint Petersburg State University of Economics has an International branch outside the Russian Federation in Dubai. It is named Saint Petersburg State Economic University (Dubai branch).

History 

The history of the University begins in 1906 when Higher Commercial Courses of M.V. Pobedinski were arranged in Saint Petersburg. In 1919 the courses were altered into Institute of National Economy and in 1930 the Leningrad Institute of Engineering and Economics was set up. In 1992 the Institute received the Academy status and in 2000 the Academy became the University. On 1 August 2012 it was merged with  Saint Petersburg State University of Economics and Finance and Saint Petersburg State University of Service and Economics to create Saint Petersburg State University of Economics.

Study programs 
Specialist degree (5 years). After receiving specialist degree students may apply for further postgraduate degree - Candidate of sciences (kandidat nauk), which is equivalent to PhD. Major part of courses is given in Russian, though there are several programs given in English.

Faculties 
Faculty of Business and Commerce
Faculty of Humanities
Faculty of IT in economics and management
Faculty of Management
Faculty of law and economic safety 
Faculty of Entrepreneurship and Finance
Faculty of Regional Economics and management 
Faculty of tourism and hospitality
Faculty of economics and management in machinery 
Faculty of logistics and transport
Faculty of economics and management in the oil-gas-chemical complex and environmental safety
Management of innovation Institute
Higher school of Economics and Management

Partner universities 
Educational cooperation exists with the universities of Finland, France, Germany, Lithuania, Sweden, Estonia, Netherlands, Denmark, Italy, Czech Republic, Belgium, China, Ukraine, Poland, etc. Among partners are ESC Rennes School of Business, Groupe École supérieure de commerce de Troyes, Rotterdam Business School, Uppsala University, etc. Language of instruction is English, though if students speak native language of the school it is possible to receive a stipend, which covers some costs (e.g. accommodation).

Alumni 
Alexei Mordashov - main shareholder and the CEO of Severstal
Anatoly Chubays - head of the Russian Nanotechnology Corporation, and a member of the Advisory Council for JPMorgan Chase.
Arkady Kobitsky - CEO LOMO

See also 
 List of institutions of higher learning in Russia

External links 
 UNECON official website in English
 St.Petersburg State Economic University, Dubai Branch

Universities in Saint Petersburg
Business schools in Russia
Engineering universities and colleges in Russia
Economics schools
1906 establishments in the Russian Empire